Southern Hills is a neighborhood of the independent city of Roanoke, Virginia, United States. Located geographically as the city's southernmost neighborhood, Southern Hills was annexed from Roanoke County in 1976 and has seen significant residential and commercial development since the 1990s. It borders the neighborhoods of the Franklin-Colonial and South Roanoke on the north, Garden City on the east and Roanoke County on the south and west. Its western boundary runs concurrent with U.S. 220.

References

External links
 Southern Hills Neighborhood Plan

Neighborhoods in Roanoke, Virginia